Serengetilagus is a genus of lagomorph in the family Leporidae. It lived in the Pliocene of Kenya and Tanzania and the Late Miocene of Chad. Serengetilagus is the best-represented taxon from Laetoli, with approximately 34 percent of fossils in the Laetolil Beds attributed to this genus. Additional specimens from Angola, Morocco and the Ukraine may also belong to this genus. It had a number of specific features unknown in other lagomorphs, such as a "missing" mesoflexid on its third premolar.

References

Prehistoric lagomorphs
Leporidae
Prehistoric placental genera